Allan Forrest Fisher (September 1, 1885 – July 25, 1941) was an American silent film actor.

Life and career
Allan Forrest Fisher starred in 119 films, mostly silent, between 1913 and 1932. He appeared in films such as The Torch Bearer, with actress Charlotte Burton.

in 1916, he married actress Ann Little; they were divorced in 1918. On January 8, 1922, Forrest married actress Lottie Pickford in Hollywood. They divorced in 1928.

Partial filmography

 Called Back (1914)
 The Ruby Circle (1914)
 The Sign of the Spade (1916)
 Dulcie's Adventure (1916)
 Periwinkle (1917)
 Melissa of the Hills (1917)
 Charity Castle (1917)
 Her Country's Call (1917)
 Peggy Leads the Way (1917)
 The Mate of the Sally Ann (1917)
 Beauty and the Rogue (1918)
 Powers That Prey (1918)
 A Bit of Jade (1918)
 Social Briars (1918)
 The Ghost of Rosy Taylor (1918)
 The Eyes of Julia Deep (1918)
 Rosemary Climbs the Heights (1918)
 The Amazing Impostor (1919)
 The Intrusion of Isabel (1919)
 A Bachelor's Wife (1919)
 Yvonne from Paris (1919)
 Over the Garden Wall (1919)
 Li Ting Lang (1920)
 The Purple Cipher (1920)
 Cheated Love (1921)
 The Invisible Fear (1921)
 The Hole in the Wall (1921)
 The Man from Lost River (1921)
 What Women Will Do (1921)
 The Forgotten Woman (1921)
 They Shall Pay (1921)
 Tillie (1922)
 Very Truly Yours (1922)
 Lights of the Desert (1922)
 The New Teacher (1922)
 Seeing's Believing (1922)
 The Heart Specialist (1922)
 Long Live the King (1923)
 Crinoline and Romance (1923)
 A Noise in Newboro (1923)
 The Siren of Seville (1924)
 Don't Doubt Your Husband (1924)
 In Love with Love (1924)
 Dorothy Vernon of Haddon Hall (1924)
 The Dressmaker from Paris (1925)
 Pampered Youth (1925)
 Rose of the World (1925)
 The Prince of Pilsen (1926)
 The Carnival Girl (1926)
 Two Can Play (1926)
 Fifth Avenue (1926)
 The Phantom Bullet (1926)
 Summer Bachelors (1926)
 The Desert Bride (1928)
 Sally of the Scandals (1928)
 The Winged Horseman (1929)
 The Phantom Express (1932)

References

External links

1885 births
1941 deaths
Male actors from New York City
People from Brooklyn
American male silent film actors
20th-century American male actors